Forever King is a twelve-track mixtape by 50 Cent with 90s R&B samples provided by Mister Cee. The collection is dedicated to the death of Michael Jackson.

Background
The collection was initially called Sincerely Southside Part 2, but the death of Michael Jackson stimulated a last minute renaming. Comparing to his last release, War Angel LP, 50 Cent stated:

The cover art for Forever King features 50 Cent's face and his New York Yankees cap digitally imposed on a skull encrusted with diamonds. Another version is more ordinary, featuring a jeweled skull with tilted crown.

Track listing

References

50 Cent albums
2009 mixtape albums